The National Amalgamated Central, Local and Parastatal Manual Workers' Union (often referred to as The Manual Workers) is a trade union in Botswana.

References

Botswana Federation of Trade Unions
Organisations based in Gaborone
Trade unions in Botswana